Jacques Dupont (19 June 1928 – 4 November 2019) was a French racing cyclist and Olympic champion in track cycling. He won a gold medal in the 1000m time trial at the 1948 Summer Olympics in London. He also won a bronze medal in the team road race, together with José Beyaert and Alain Moineau. He won Paris–Tours in 1951 and 1955. He won the 1955 event in what was then a record speed for a professional race covering the 253 km at an average of 43.666 km per hour and being awarded the Ruban Jaune.

References

External links

1928 births
2019 deaths
French male cyclists
Olympic gold medalists for France
Cyclists at the 1948 Summer Olympics
Olympic cyclists of France
French track cyclists
Olympic medalists in cycling
Sportspeople from Ariège (department)
Medalists at the 1948 Summer Olympics
Olympic bronze medalists for France
Cyclists from Occitania (administrative region)